Don Bennett was a baseball player in the Negro leagues. He played with the Birmingham Black Barons in 1930.

References

External links
 and Seamheads 

Birmingham Black Barons players
Year of birth missing
Year of death missing